Giovani "Gio" Benitez (born October 29, 1985) is an American broadcast journalist and correspondent for ABC News, who appears on Good Morning America, World News Tonight, 20/20, and Nightline. He also hosts the Fusion collaboration version of Nightline.  He has won three television news Emmy awards. On April 9, 2020, he was promoted to Transportation Correspondent, operating from New York and DC.

On September 8, 2020, he hosted a special season finale for the sixteenth season of the ABC program What Would You Do?.

Early life
Benitez was born in Miami to a family who immigrated to the United States from Cuba. He graduated from Miami Coral Park High School in 2004; and in 2008, graduated with a Bachelor of Arts degree in anthropology and sociology from Florida International University. He is  bilingual in English and Spanish.

Personal life
Benitez and Tommy DiDario became engaged on September 17, 2015, in Paris. They married in a Miami ceremony on April 16, 2016. DiDario is a fitness trainer and Instagram influencer who has also appeared on television shows, including Rachael Ray.

References

External links
ABC Medianet biography

1985 births
Living people
21st-century American journalists
ABC News personalities
American gay writers
American people of Cuban descent
American television news anchors
American television reporters and correspondents
Florida International University alumni
Gay journalists
Hispanic and Latino American journalists
LGBT Hispanic and Latino American people
American LGBT journalists
LGBT people from Florida
People from Miami
What Would You Do? (2008 TV program)